Derek Beaven (born 1947) is a British novelist. His first novel, Newton's Niece, won the Commonwealth Writers Prize for best first book, Europe and South Asia. His second book, Acts of Mutiny was shortlisted for the Guardian Fiction Prize and the Encore Award.

Beaven was born in South London. He studied at Ashlyns School, Hertfordshire. He read English at Oxford University. 
He lives in Maidenhead, Berkshire, England.

Works
Newton′s Niece, Faber and Faber, 1994, 
Acts of Mutiny, Fourth Estate, 1998, 
If the Invader Comes, Fourth Estate, 2001, His Coldest Winter, Fourth Estate, 2005; HarperCollins, 2006, 

Reviews

"Acts of Muniny", The New York Times'', Mark Schone, 19 March 2000

References

1947 births
Writers from London
20th-century British novelists
21st-century British novelists
Alumni of the University of Oxford
Living people
British male novelists
20th-century English male writers
21st-century English male writers